Ryde Inshore Rescue Service is a voluntary run lifeboat station located in the town of Ryde on the Isle of Wight. Ryde Inshore Rescue is an independent lifeboat station within the United Kingdom. It is not part of the Royal National Lifeboat Institution and does not receive funding from the RNLI or the government.

The station is on call to the Coast Guard 24 hours a day, 365 days a year. The service operates an inshore lifeboat from its station at Appley Lane.

History 
The first lifeboat service in the town started in 1858 and was run on a voluntary basis. On 8 May 1869 the town's rescue volunteers service was supplied with a new lifeboat called The Captain Hans Busk which was kept and launched from a slipway on Ryde Pier. Volunteer Force originator Hans Busk paid for the boat, and it was named after him.

The lifeboat was built by J. Samuel White at Cowes on the Isle of Wight. The lifeboat had 24 oars and she was fitted with two sailing masts. She was steered with a galvanised iron tiller. For transit the lifeboat had its own carriage and wheels and could be moved over land if the situation required.

First boathouse 
The first station boathouse was constructed on the west side of the town's pier in 1870. In 1894 the station was handed over to the RNLI, who operated it until 1923. The station was closed after a motor lifeboat was stationed at nearby Bembridge Lifeboat Station.

Ryde lifeboat disaster 
Early on the afternoon of Tuesday, 1 January 1907, Augustus Jarrett, master of the 56-ton barge Jane, reported that a small boat belonging to the Jane had been stolen. This boat was later seen drifting out to sea with a single occupant. The water was rough and the weather was squally.

Around 5:30 that evening, the Ryde lifeboat Selina was launched to assist, with nine crew, including coxswain William John Bartlett at the helm. By this time it had become dark. Selina was a  wooden whaleboat design lifeboat. It had been designed to render assistance in shallow, smooth waters and lacked self-righting capability; it was not intended for rescue in storms or deep waters. The lifeboat searched the area but was unable to locate the small boat.

Weather conditions deteriorated, and around 7:45 PM, a sudden heavy squall capsized the Selina, throwing the crew into cold water without any way of signalling for help. The lifeboat drifted across the Solent to Southsea on the south coast of the English mainland. Two of the nine crew had succumbed to exposure.

Meanwhile, the small boat belonging to the Jane had managed to row across the Solent, landing opposite Eastney Barracks at Southsea at around 7:00 PM, prior to the capsizing of the Selina. Its occupant turned out to be Augustus Jarrett. Jarrett maintained that the small boat had been stolen and he had later recovered it at the Dover Street Slipway, although later inquiry suggested it may simply have floated away after being poorly secured.

An inquest into the accident was held on 4 January 1907. The jury's verdict was that the deaths had been accidental and not the result of negligence.

Formation of Ryde Inshore Rescue 
A double drowning incident at the end of Ryde Pier in 1956 prompted the reformation of a rescue organisation to serve the town.

See also
Independent lifeboats in Britain and Ireland

Neighbouring Station Locations

References

External links

 

Lifeboat stations on the Isle of Wight
Organisations based on the Isle of Wight
Independent Lifeboat stations
Ryde